Alison Clare Quinn, OAM (born 21 April 1977) is an Australian Paralympic athlete who won five medals at three Paralympics from 1992 to 2000.

Personal
Quinn was born in the Sydney suburb of Manly with cerebral palsy; she has hemiplegia on the left side of her body.  She became involved in gymnastics to increase coordination and symmetry when she was two years old.  She now trains in various sports including swimming, weights, and track work at the Sydney Academy of Sport. Quinn is employed as a part-time gymnastic coach and a motivational speaker, who is committed to increasing awareness of disabled sport in the community.

Competitive career

Paralympic Games

Quinn won two gold medals at the 1992 Barcelona Games in the Women's 100 m C7–8 and Women's 200 m C7–8 events, for which she received a Medal of the Order of Australia. At the 1996 Atlanta Games, she won a bronze medal in the Women's 100 m T36–37 event. She won a gold medal with a world record time at the 2000 Sydney Games in the women's 100 m T38 event and a silver medal in the  women's 200 m T38 event.

IPC World Championships
At the 1994 IPC Athletics World Championships in Berlin, Quinn won gold medals in the Women's 100 m T37 and 200 m T37 and Long Jump F37. She also came fourth in the Women's Javelin F37. At the 1998 IPC Athletics World Championships in Birmingham, she won gold medal in the Women's 100 m T38 and silver medal in the 200 m T38.

In 2000 Quinn received an Australian Sports Medal in recognition of her performance at the Paralympics and her two world records. Quinn was trained by Jackie Byrnes who was a national level athlete in the 1960s.

References

External links

 Alison Quinn at Australian Athletics Historical Results
 

Paralympic athletes of Australia
Athletes (track and field) at the 1992 Summer Paralympics
Athletes (track and field) at the 1996 Summer Paralympics
Athletes (track and field) at the 2000 Summer Paralympics
Medalists at the 1992 Summer Paralympics
Medalists at the 1996 Summer Paralympics
Medalists at the 2000 Summer Paralympics
Paralympic gold medalists for Australia
Paralympic silver medalists for Australia
Paralympic bronze medalists for Australia
Cerebral Palsy category Paralympic competitors
Track and field athletes with cerebral palsy
Recipients of the Medal of the Order of Australia
Recipients of the Australian Sports Medal
Australian female sprinters
Sportswomen from New South Wales
Athletes from Sydney
1977 births
Living people
Paralympic medalists in athletics (track and field)
Medalists at the World Para Athletics Championships